Makerere University Business School (MUBS) is the school of business of Makerere University, Uganda's oldest university. MUBS provides business and management education at the certificate, diploma, undergraduate and postgraduate levels.

Location
The coordinates of the school campus are: 0°19'42.0"N 32°36'59.0"E (Latitude:0.328333; Longitude:32.616389).

History
MUBS was established in the 1960s as National College of Business Studies (NCBS). It offered business and management diplomas as well as professional training in business. At that time, the college offered diplomas, the main ones being the Uganda Diploma in Business Studies and the Higher Diploma in Marketing.

In 1997, Faculty of Commerce at Makerere University was merged with NCBS, thereby creating MUBS, a constituent college of Makerere University.

In 2001, due to changes in the laws of Uganda, MUBS transformed from a constituent college of Makerere University to a "public tertiary institution" affiliated to Makerere University. However this arrangement did not work well, resulting in Makerere introducing competing duplicate courses at the main campus, while MUBS started to agitate for complete autonomy. Finally in 2012, the autonomy sought by MUBS was granted by the Uganda Ministry of Education and Sports.

Autonomy
In January 2012, Ugandan media reported that MUBS will break away from Makerere University and reconstitute itself into an independent university. This will result in the change of its name to a new name, yet to be determined.

In August 2013, Uganda's Attorney General began drafting the necessary legislation to separate MUBS from Makerere University. The draft was expected to be presented to the Ugandan Parliament for debate and enactment into law.

Faculties
As of November 2022,  the school has the following faculties:

 Faculty of Commerce
 Faculty of Computing and Informatics
 Faculty of Entrepreneurship and Small Business Management
 Faculty of Business Administration
 Faculty of Management
 Faculty of Marketing and International Business
 Faculty of Economics, Energy and Management Sciences
 Faculty of Procurement and Logistics Management
 Faculty of Tourism, Hospitality & Languages
 Faculty of Science Education
 Faculty of Vocational and Distance Education
 Faculty of Graduate Studies and Research

Undergraduate courses
Reference:

 Bachelor of Business Administration
 Bachelor of Human Resource Management
 Bachelor of Entrepreneurship & Small Business Management
 Bachelor of Leadership and Governance
 Bachelor of Procurement and Supply Chain Management
 Bachelor of Business Statistics
 Bachelor of Commerce 
 Bachelor of Arts in Economics
 Bachelor of Science in Accounting 
 Bachelor of Real Estates Finance Management
 Bachelor of Science in Finance 
 Bachelor of Business Computing
 Bachelor of Office and Information Management
 Bachelor of Transport & Logistics Management
 Bachelor of International Business
 Bachelor of Catering & Hotel Management
 Bachelor of Leisure & Hospitality Management
 Bachelor of Science in Marketing
 Bachelor of Travel & Tourism Management

Study centres : Arua, Jinja, Mbarara and Mbale
 Bachelor of Business Administration 
 Bachelor of Human Resource Management
 Bachelor of Procurement & Logistics Management.

Graduate courses
Reference:
 Master of Arts in Economic Policy and Management 
 Master of Business Administration (MBA)
 Master of Energy Economics
 Master of Business Management
 Master of Economic Policy Management
 Master of Science in Finance & Accounting
 Master of Science in Procurement and Supply Chain Management 
 Master of International Business 
 Master of Science in Hospitality & Tourism Management (MSHTM)
 Master of Science in Entrepreneurship 
 Master of Science in Marketing 
 Master of Science in Accounting & Finance 
 Master of Banking and Investment Management 
 Masters of Hospitality and Tourism Management
 Master of Human Resource Management 
 Masters in Leadership & Governance
 Executive Master of Business Administration
 Doctor of Business Administration 
 Doctor of Philosophy.
 Doctor of Energy Economics

Outreach Centres
The School operates the following outreach centres in addition to the Academic Faculties:
 Entrepreneurship, Innovation and Incubation Centre 
 The ICT Centre
 The Leadership Centre
 Microfinance Centre
 The MUBS Career and Skills Development Centre
 The MUBS Centre for Executive Education

Notable Scholars
Makerere University Business School has been ranked by AD Science among the Top 3 leading Ugandan Universities  (after Makerere University the mother institution and Makerere University College of Health Sciences) in Scientific research and publication. Leading scientists  as of 2022 AD Science rankings  include Prof. Joseph M. Ntayi, Prof. Stephen Nkundabanyanga, Juma Bananuka (RIP), Prof. Laura Orobia, Prof. Twaaha Kigongo Kaawaase, Prof. Muhammed Ngoma, Prof. Geoffrey Kituyi Mayoka, Prof. Musa Bukoma Moya, Bob Ssekiziyivu, Zainab Tumwebaze, Dr. Edward Kabaale, among others. Other notable scholars include Prof. Waswa Balunywa, Prof. John C. Munene, Prof. Moses Muhwezi, Prof. Robert Kyeyune, Prof. Suudi Nangoli, among others.

Notable Alumni
MUBS has a number of notable Alumni in the fields of Academia, Business, Entrepreneurship, Politics, Entertainment and Society.Some of these have either taught or studied at the Institution. 

Notable Alumni and Former Staff of Makerere University Business School include;

Politicians and Civil Servants
 Rt. Hon. Anita Annet Among- Speaker of the 11th Parliament of Uganda
 Mr. Ramathan Ggoobi, Permanent Secretary/ Secretary to the Treasury, Ministry of Finance, Uganda
 Hon. Kyooma Xavier, Member of Parliament (MP) for Ibanda North Constituency 2021 - 2026.

Visiting Professors
 Prof. Peter Rosa – University of Edinburgh
 Prof. Tom Root – Drake University
 Prof. Augustine Ahiauzu – International Centre for Management Research and Training (CIMRAT) Nigeria.
 Prof. Damien Ejigiri – Southern University
 Prof. Gerrit Rooks – Technical University Eindhoven
 Prof. Jimmy D. Senteza – Drake University
 Prof Victor W.A Mbarika – Southern University
 Hassan Omar Mahadallah Ph.D – Southern University
 Prof. Timothy Shaw – The University of the West indies
 Prof. Pascal T. Ngoboka – University of Wisconsin
 Prof.Michael Frese – Leuphana University
 Prof. G.V. Joshi
 Prof. Debra . S. Bishop
 Dr. Mary Clark Bruce
 Dr. M.S. Moodithaya
 Dr. Chanika R. Jones

Academia
 Prof. Arthur Sserwanga – Former Vice chancellor of Muteesa I Royal University
 Dr. Stephen Robert Isabalija – Former Vice chancellor of Victoria University
 Prof. Nixon Kamukama- DVC- Mbarara University of Science & Technology

Sports
 Dorcus Inzikuru – Track and field athlete – winner of the inaugural world title in women’s 3000 m steeplechase
 Davis Kamoga – Athlete – won the first Ugandan medal at the World Championships Athens 1997

Entertainment
 Mariam Ndagire – Artist in the Uganda Entertainment Industry
 Quiin Abenakyo – Miss Uganda 2018 -> Crowned Miss Africa 2018

See also
 List of universities in Uganda
 Education in Uganda
 Makerere University
 Universities Offering Business Courses in Uganda

References

External links

MUBS Rebrands as Metropolitan University Business School

Makerere University
Business schools in Uganda
1997 establishments in Uganda
Nakawa Division
 
Educational institutions established in 1997